Acoustic Traveller is the 1996 album from John McEuen. John is notable for being a longtime member of the Nitty Gritty Dirt Band for which he was a multi-instrument and composer/arranger. He played on many of their charting albums and singles. He also records as a solo artist, and has appeared as a guest musician on many albums by many artists.

Reception

The AllMusic review by William Ruhlmann awarded the album 4.5 stars stating "John McEuen plays a variety of stringed instruments, including mandolin, guitar, banjo, dulcimer, lap steel guitar, and even a Japanese koto on this accomplished album of folk, country, bluegrass, and Western-flavored traditional-sounding original instrumentals, with one vocal track, "I Am a Pilgrim." There are many familiar sounds from McEuen's long career on Acoustic Traveller, including "Mr. Bojangles (Suite).".

Track listing
All tracks by John McEuen except where noted.

 "Gypsy Knights" – 5:45
 "Fisher's" – 1:56
 "Keep Walking" – 3:56
 "Turki Innastra" – 2:17
 "Acoustic Traveller" – 3:32
 "Moonlight Dancing" – 4:00
 "Lady's Choice" – 2:56
 "Old Country" – 4:23
 "Homecoming" (Dom Camardella, McEuen) – 4:24
 "Go Lightly in the Night" – 4:01
 "Back N 4th in Pahrump, Nevada" – 2:53
 "After Dark" – 2:54
 "I Am a Pilgrim" (Merle Travis) – 3:29
 "Mr. Bojangles (Suite)" (Jerry Jeff Walker) – 4:58
 "Gypsy Knights (Reprise)" – 4:12

Personnel
Nashville Sessions 5, 7, 8 & 12
 David Hoffner – hammered dulcimer, synth, rhodes piano
 John Vogt – bass
 Jonathan McEuen – electric guitar
 David Coe – fiddle
 Kenny Malone – percussion
 John McEuen – guitar, banjo, mandolin, koto

Santa Barbara Sessions 1-4, 6, 9-11, 13-15
 Randy Tico – bass, serdo drum
 Phil Salazar – fiddle
 Mike Mullen – mandolin
 Jonathan McEuen – electric guitar, acoustic rhythm
 Lorenzo Martinez – percussion
 Dom Camardella – piano, synth
 Billy Puett – recorders, flute
 John McEuen – acoustic guitar, mandolin, lap guitar, banjo, dulcimer, vocals
 Jeff Valdez – harmonica

See also
 Nitty Gritty Dirt Band discography

References

1996 albums
Vanguard Records albums
John McEuen albums